Noma neonatorum is a cutaneous condition, a manifestation of infection, usually Pseudomonas aeruginosa sepsis, and has been reported almost exclusively in developing countries. Despite the similarity of facial lesions, noma neonatorum is not related to noma.

See also 
 Green nail syndrome
 List of cutaneous conditions

References 

Bacterium-related cutaneous conditions